Unique primarily refers to:
Uniqueness, a state or condition wherein something is unlike anything else 
In mathematics and logic, a unique object is the only object with a certain property, see Uniqueness quantification

Unique may also refer to:

Companies
Unique Art, an American toy company
Unique Broadcasting Company, a former name of UBC Media Group, based in London
Unique Business News a television news channel in Taiwan
Unique Mobility, a former name of UQM Technologies, a manufacturing company based in the United States
Unique Pub Company, a pub company based in the United Kingdom, acquired by Enterprise Inns
Unique Theater, a theater in Minneapolis, Minnesota, United States
Unique Group, a conglomerate in Bangladesh

Music
Unique (DJ Encore album)
Unique (Juliette Schoppmann album)
Unique (band), a musical group from New York City
Unique (also known as Darren Styles), British musician
Unique Records, a former name of RKO/Unique Records
Unique Recording Studios, a recording studio in New York City
Unique (musician), a musician and singer-songwriter based in Philippines

Other
UNIQUe Certification, a label awarded to higher education institutions
HMS Unique, name of three ships of the Royal Navy
Operation Unique, code-name of criminal proceedings linked to the Pitcairn sexual assault trial of 2004
Team Unique, a synchronized skating team from Finland
Unique, Iowa, a hamlet in Iowa, United States
Wade "Unique" Adams, a character in the television series Glee

See also

Essentially unique
Sui generis
The Uniques (disambiguation)
Uniq (disambiguation)
Younique (disambiguation)